António Vieira (born 6 January 1912 in Moita – deceased) was a Portuguese footballer who played as a defender.

External links 
 
 
 

1912 births
People from Moita
Portuguese footballers
Association football defenders
Primeira Liga players
Vitória F.C. players
S.L. Benfica footballers
Portugal international footballers
Year of death missing
Sportspeople from Setúbal District